Pseudorhaphitoma ditylota is a small sea snail, a marine gastropod mollusk in the family Mangeliidae.

Description
The length of the shell attains 7 mm, its diameter 2 mm.

(Original description) The solid, fusiform shell has a whitish color or is flesh-colored. It contains 9 whorls, of which two globose and almost translucent whorls in the protoconch. The third and sometimes the fourth whorl show simple spiral carinae. The other whorls show thick longitudinal ribs and are spirally bicarinate, producing sharp transverse plicules. The body whorl is tricarinate and continues at the same time and uninterrupted up to its base with 8 - 10 spirally lirae. The aperture is ovate. The slightly expanded outer lip is incrassate. The sinus is rather wide. The columella shows two plications or two tubercles.

This species is remarkable by the absence of fine grained spirals and is by this an  aberrant members of this genus.

Distribution
This marine genus occurs in the Persian Gulf, in the Gulf of Carpentaria and off Queensland, Australia

References

 Melvill, J.C. 1917. A revision of the Turridae (Pleurotomidae) occurring in the Persian Gulf, Gulf of Oman and North Arabian Sea as evidenced mostly through the results of dredgings carried out by Mr. F.W. Townsend, 1893-1914. Proceedings of the Malacological Society of London 12(4-5): 140-201
 Ong Che RG. & Morton B. (1991). Spatial and temporal variations in the subtidal macrobenthic community of Tai Tam bay, Hong Kong. In: Morton B, editor. Asian Marine Biology 8. Hong Kong University Press, Hong Kong. pp 193–216

External links
 Proceedings of the Malacological Society of London v. 10 (1912-1913) 
 

ditylota
Gastropods described in 1912